Kevin Santiago Quintero Chavarro (born 28 October 1998) is a Colombian track cyclist, who specializes in sprinting events. He has won numerous medals in continental games and championships, as well as competed at the 2018, 2019 and 2020 UCI Track Cycling World Championships.

He represented Colombia at the 2020 Summer Olympics.

Major results

2015
 2nd  Kilometer, Pan American Junior Championships
2016
 Pan American Junior Championships
1st  Team sprint
1st  Kilometer
2nd  Sprint
3rd  Keirin
 3rd Team sprint, National Championships
2017
 National Championships
2nd Team sprint
3rd Keirin
2018
 South American Games
1st  Team sprint
3rd  Sprint
 National Championships
1st  Kilometer
1st  Sprint
2nd Team sprint
 Central American and Caribbean Games
2nd  Kilometer
3rd  Sprint
3rd  Team sprint
 Pan American Championships
2nd  Kilometer
2nd  Team sprint
3rd  Sprint
3rd  Keirin
2019
 Pan American Games
1st  Keirin
1st  Team sprint
2nd  Sprint
 UCI World Cup
1st  Keirin, Brisbane
2nd  Keirin, Milton
 Pan American Championships
1st  Keirin
1st  Kilometer
3rd  Sprint
 National Championships
1st  Keirin
1st  Sprint
2nd Kilometer
2nd Team sprint
2021
 Pan American Championships
1st  Kilometer
1st  Sprint
1st  Keirin
1st  Team sprint
 National Championships
1st  Sprint
2nd Kilometer
 UCI Nations Cup
1st  Overall Keirin
1st  Overall Sprint
1st  Sprint, St. Petersburg
1st  Keirin, Cali
2nd  Sprint, Cali
2nd  Team sprint, Cali
 UCI Champions League
3rd  Sprint, Panevėžys
3rd  Keirin, London
2022
 UCI Nations Cup
1st  Overall Keirin
1st  Keirin, Milton
2nd  Keirin, Glasgow
2nd  Team sprint, Cali
 Bolivarian Games
1st  Keirin
1st  Sprint
1st  Team sprint
 National Championships
1st  Sprint
2nd Keirin
3rd Team sprint
 Pan American Championships
2nd  Keirin
3rd  Sprint
3rd  Team sprint
 3rd  Keirin, UCI World Championships

References

1998 births
Living people
Colombian track cyclists
Colombian male cyclists
People from Palmira, Valle del Cauca
Pan American Games medalists in cycling
Pan American Games silver medalists for Colombia
Pan American Games gold medalists for Colombia
Cyclists at the 2019 Pan American Games
Medalists at the 2019 Pan American Games
South American Games gold medalists for Colombia
South American Games bronze medalists for Colombia
South American Games medalists in cycling
Central American and Caribbean Games bronze medalists for Colombia
Central American and Caribbean Games silver medalists for Colombia
Central American and Caribbean Games medalists in cycling
Cyclists at the 2020 Summer Olympics
Olympic cyclists of Colombia
Sportspeople from Valle del Cauca Department
21st-century Colombian people
Competitors at the 2018 Central American and Caribbean Games